Prince Friedrich of Hesse and by Rhine (Friedrich Wilhelm August Victor Leopold Ludwig; 7 October 1870 – 29 May 1873) was the second son of Louis IV, Grand Duke of Hesse, and Princess Alice of the United Kingdom, one of the daughters of Queen Victoria. He was a maternal great-uncle of Prince Philip, Duke of Edinburgh, through his eldest sister Princess Victoria of Hesse and by Rhine.

Life
Friedrich, called "Frittie" by his family, was a cheerful and lively child.

"Leopold" was added as one of his names in honour of his mother's brother, Prince Leopold, Duke of Albany. Prince Leopold, who was Friedrich's godfather, had the blood disorder haemophilia.

In February 1873, he was diagnosed with haemophilia when he cut his ear and it bled for three days. Bandages could not stanch the flow of blood.

Death
In late May 1873, Friedrich and his older brother Ernst were playing together in their mother's bedroom. Ernst ran to another room, which was set at right angles to Alice's bedroom and peered through the window at his younger brother. Alice ran to get Ernst away from the window. When she was out of the room, Friedrich climbed onto a chair next to an open window in his mother's bedroom to get a closer look at his brother. The chair tipped over and Friedrich tumbled through the window, falling  to the balustrade below. He survived the fall and may have lived had he not had haemophilia. He died hours later of a brain hemorrhage.

Aftermath
Following Friedrich's death, his distraught mother often prayed at his grave and marked anniversaries of small events in his life. His brother Ernst told his mother he wanted all of the family to die together, not alone "like Frittie." Two of Friedrich's sisters, Irene and Alix, also had sons with haemophilia.

Ancestry

Notes

References

Mager, Hugo (1998). Elizabeth: Grand Duchess of Russia. Carroll and Graf Publishers, Inc. 

1870 births
1873 deaths
German children
Haemophilia in European royalty
House of Hesse
Deaths from blood disease
Burials at the Mausoleum for the Grand Ducal House of Hesse, Rosenhöhe (Darmstadt)
Royalty and nobility who died as children
Sons of monarchs